The 1979 Houston Cougars football team, also known as the Houston Cougars, Houston, or UH, represented the University of Houston in the 1979 NCAA Division I-A football season. The Cougars were led by 18th-year head coach Bill Yeoman and played their home games at the Astrodome in Houston, Texas. They competed as members of the Southwest Conference, finishing as co-champions with Arkansas. This was Houston's second consecutive conference championship, and their third overall in their first four years as members of the conference.

The Cougars finished the season with a record of 11–1. Their only loss was at home to the eighth-ranked Texas Longhorns, 21–13. Houston was invited to the 1980 Cotton Bowl Classic, played on New Year's Day, where they defeated seventh-ranked Nebraska. Houston finished ranked fifth in both major final polls.

Schedule

Roster

References

Houston
Houston Cougars football seasons
Southwest Conference football champion seasons
Cotton Bowl Classic champion seasons
Houston Cougars football